Chilthorne Domer is a village and parish in Somerset, England, situated  north west of Yeovil in the South Somerset district.  The village has a population of 574. It is situated on the old coach road from Ilchester to Yeovil.

History

The village was known as Cilterne in the Domesday Book of 1086, which is a British hill name including the element celto meaning high.  The second part of the name was after the Domer family, who held one of the manors. The other was held by the Vagg family and was known as Chiltorne Vagg. This survives in the name of Vagg farm southeast of the village.

The parish of Chilthorne Domer was part of the Stone Hundred.

The current manor house was built in the 17th century and has its own well. It was used until 1939.

Governance

The parish council has responsibility for local issues, including setting an annual precept (local rate) to cover the council's operating costs and producing annual accounts for public scrutiny. The parish council evaluates local planning applications and works with the local police, district council officers, and neighbourhood watch groups on matters of crime, security, and traffic. The parish council's role also includes initiating projects for the maintenance and repair of parish facilities, as well as consulting with the district council on the maintenance, repair, and improvement of highways, drainage, footpaths, public transport, and street cleaning. Conservation matters (including trees and listed buildings) and environmental issues are also the responsibility of the council.

The village falls within the Non-metropolitan district of South Somerset, which was formed on 1 April 1974 under the Local Government Act 1972, having previously been part of Yeovil Rural District. The district council is responsible for local planning and building control, local roads, council housing, environmental health, markets and fairs, refuse collection and recycling, cemeteries and crematoria, leisure services, parks, and tourism.

Somerset County Council is responsible for running the largest and most expensive local services such as education, social services, libraries, main roads, public transport, policing and fire services, trading standards, waste disposal and strategic planning.

It is also part of the Yeovil county constituency represented in the House of Commons of the Parliament of the United Kingdom. It elects one Member of Parliament (MP) by the first past the post system of election, and was part of the South West England constituency of the European Parliament prior to Britain leaving the European Union in January 2020, which elected seven MEPs using the d'Hondt method of party-list proportional representation.

Education

The village has a primary school for children between the ages of 4 and 11.

Religious sites

The Anglican parish Church of St Mary has 13th-century origins and has been designated as a Grade II* listed building. It was granted to Bruton Priory in 1301.

Notable residents

Susan Miller took the title Baroness Miller of Chilthorne Domer in 1998 after serving as a councillor at parish, district and county levels from 1987 to 2005, leading South Somerset District Council and as a member of Somerset County Council.

Stanley Adams, former pharmaceutical company executive at Hoffmann-La Roche and corporate whistleblower, lived in Chilthorne Domer from the late 1980s to 1993, when he was convicted of hiring a hit-man in a failed attempt to kill his second wife for insurance money.

References

Villages in South Somerset
Civil parishes in Somerset